Hamahara Dam is a gravity dam located in Shimane Prefecture in Japan. The dam is used for power production. The catchment area of the dam is 3000 km2. The dam impounds about 149  ha of land when full and can store 11200 thousand cubic meters of water. The construction of the dam was completed in 1953.

References

Dams in Shimane Prefecture
1953 establishments in Japan